Ethnomedicine is a study or comparison of the traditional medicine based on bioactive compounds in plants and animals and practiced by various ethnic groups, especially those with little access to western medicines, e.g., indigenous peoples.  The word ethnomedicine is sometimes used as a synonym for traditional medicine. 

Ethnomedical research is interdisciplinary; in its study of traditional medicines, it applies the methods of ethnobotany and medical anthropology. Often, the medicine traditions it studies are preserved only by oral tradition. In addition to plants, some of these traditions constitute significant interactions with insects on the Indian Subcontinent, in Africa, or elsewhere around the globe.

Scientific ethnomedical studies constitute either anthropological research or drug discovery research. Anthropological studies examine the cultural perception and context of a traditional medicine. Ethnomedicine has been used as a starting point in drug discovery, specifically those using reverse pharmacological techniques.

Ethnopharmacology

Ethnopharmacology is a related field which studies ethnic groups and their use of plant compounds. It is linked to pharmacognosy, phytotherapy (study of medicinal plants) use and ethnobotany, as this is a source of lead compounds for drug discovery. Emphasis has long been on traditional medicines, although the approach also has proven useful to the study of modern pharmaceuticals. 

It involves studies of the:
 identification and ethnotaxonomy (cognitive categorisation) of the (eventual) natural material, from which the candidate compound will be produced
 traditional preparation of the pharmaceutical forms
 bio-evaluation of the possible pharmacological action of such preparations (ethnopharmacology)
 their potential for clinical effectiveness
 socio-medical aspects implied in the uses of these compounds (medical anthropology).

See also

Ayurveda
Ethnobotany
Herbalism
Pharmacognosy
Shamanism
Traditional medicine

References

Further reading

 Fábrega, Horacio, Jr. Evolution of Sickness and Healing. Berkeley:  University of California Press, 1997. Access Apr. 2015

Ethnobiology
Medical anthropology
Traditional medicine

fr:Ethnomédecine